The International League for the Reconstruction of the Fourth International, usually known as the Fourth International, was a Trotskyist political international led by Michel Varga.

The group's origins lay in the International Committee of the Fourth International (ICFI).  Varga's League of Revolutionary Socialists of Hungary was based in Paris and was close to the Internationalist Communist Organisation (OCI), and in particular Pierre Broué.  It joined the ICFI in 1963, but when the OCI left the ICFI in 1971, Varga's group took their side.

Although Varga had sided with the OCI in the factional fight, he disagreed with their abandonment of the ICFI.  When the OCI held a preconference in 1972 to form the Organising Committee for the Reconstruction of the Fourth International (OCRFI), he spoke against, and was excluded from the new organisation.

Briefly without international links, in 1973, Varga formed the "International League for the Reconstruction of the Fourth International".  While initially quite isolated, it gained the support of groups such as the Revolutionary Workers League of Sweden in 1975 and the Revolutionary Labor League of Czechoslovakia in the 1980s.

In 1984, disputes arose within the International League, and Varga was expelled in 1984, instead forming the Group of Opposition and Continuity of the Fourth International.

In 1995, the group joined with the Revolutionary International Current, which had split from the International Workers League (Fourth International) to form International Workers Unity.

Member parties 
Trotskyist Organization of the United States
Revolutionary Labor League of Czechoslovakia
Revolutionary Workers League of Sweden
League of Revolutionary Socialists of Hungary

References

Hungary - 1: The Present Day Relevance of the Transitional Programme
Robert J. Alexander, International Trotskyism, 1921-1985

External links
Michel Varga (Balazs Nagy) papers held at the University of London

Trotskyist political internationals